Blood Harvest is a 1987 American slasher film directed by Bill Rebane, and starring Tiny Tim, Itonia Salochek and Lori Minnetti. Peter Krause appears in his first feature film role.

Plot
Jill Robinson, visiting home from college, arrives to find her parents missing and their home vandalized. Her father, a banker, has become a pariah in the rural community for foreclosing on local farms. Matters soon take a turn for the worse when Jill finds herself being stalked, and her friends disappearing one by one. With only her childhood friend and former lover, Gary, and his mentally unstable brother, Mervo, Jill fears for her life.

Cast
 Tiny Tim as Mervon Dickenson/The Marvelous Mervo/The Clown
 Itonia Salochek as Jill Robinson
 Dean West as Gary Dickenson
 Lori Minnetti as Sarah
 Peter Krause as Boyfriend
 Frank Benson as Sheriff Buckley
 Albert Jaggard as The Priest
 William Dexter as Man in Cafe

Production 
Alternate titles include "Nightmare" and "The Marvelous Mervo". Blood Harvest was filmed in three Wisconsin locations:  Gleason, Irma and Merrill.

Release 
Blood Harvest was released on January 1, 1987.

Home media 
A Blu-ray version featuring a new 4k scan of the original 16mm camera negative was released by Vinegar Syndrome in October 2018. The first 1,500 copies featured a limited edition slipcover. Special features on the Blu-ray include:

Reception and legacy 
Allmovie called Blood Harvest "an obvious stab at a piece of the dwindling slasher market shot on cheap, grainy stock with a small, amateur cast", writing that "those who appreciate Tiny Tim for his astonishing vocal range and vast repertoire of turn-of-the-century Tin Pan Alley songs will feel depressed watching him debase himself", but that "others might find enjoyment in a particularly wretched slasher fiasco that should provide derisive yucks for genre fans.

Squanch Games licensed the film to be used in their 2022 video game High on Life. The opening scene can be seen on the TV in the main character's living room after defeating the first three bounties.

References

External links

 

Films directed by Bill Rebane
1980s slasher films
1987 films
American slasher films
1987 horror films
Films shot in Minnesota
Films shot in Wisconsin
Films set in Wisconsin
Horror films about clowns
American serial killer films
American exploitation films
1980s English-language films
1980s American films